Kallymenia is a genus of red algae belonging to the family Kallymeniaceae.

The genus has cosmopolitan distribution.

Species

Species:

Kallymenia ercegovicii  
Kallymenia feldmannii 
Kallymenia lacerata 
Kallymenia lacinifolia

References

Kallymeniaceae
Red algae genera